L.A. Wars is a 1994 American action film directed by Tony Kandah and Martin Morris. It stars Vince Murdocco as a disgraced former officer of the Los Angeles Police Department who becomes involved in a conflict between two rival crime syndicates.

Cast
 Vince Murdocco as Jaquinn
 Mary E. Zilba as Carla Giovani
 A. J. Stephans as Carlo Giovani
 Johnny Venokur as Vinnie Scoletti
 Rodrigo Obregón as Raul Guzman
 David Jean Thomas as Capt. Roark
 Kerri Kasem as Rosa
 Sam Sabbagh as Vick

Reception
A reviewer for the New York Daily News gave the film a score of two stars, noting that the "invincible heroics" of Murdocco's character "grow irritating", but commending the performances of Obregón and Venokur.

Brian Orndorf, in a retrospective review of the film for Blu-ray.com, wrote that it "[finds] success when it stops trying to be anything more than a VHS-ready bruiser that loves to shoot up characters and burn everything else to the ground."

Home media
L.A. Wars first received a home video release in June 1994. In May 2020, the film was released on Blu-ray and DVD by Vinegar Syndrome.

References

External links
 
 

1994 films
1994 action films
American action films
Fictional portrayals of the Los Angeles Police Department
American police detective films
1990s English-language films
1990s American films
English-language action films